This is a list of episodes for the television series Reno 911!. It premiered on July 23, 2003, and ended on July 8, 2009, with a total of 88 episodes. A film titled Reno 911!: Miami debuted in theaters while airing the fourth season. The show itself returned on May 4, 2020, after a nearly 11-year hiatus. Resurrected by a new short-form mobile television streaming service, called Quibi, Reno 911!'s 7th season consisted of 25 episodes, running approximately 7 minutes each. In 2021, a second film titled Reno 911!: The Hunt for QAnon was released on Paramount+.

Series overview

Episodes

Season 1 (2003)

Season 2 (2004)

Season 3 (2005)

Season 4 (2006–07)

Season 5 (2008)

Season 6 (2009)
Season six debuted on April 1, 2009.  Deputies Garcia, Johnson, and Kimball did not return for the sixth season. According to Lt. Dangle, these deputies were lost in the explosion during the previous season cliffhanger.

Season 7 (2020)

Season 8 (2022): Reno 911! Defunded
On September 3, 2020, Quibi announced that they had renewed the series for an additional season prior to announcing on October 21, 2020, that the service would be shutdown shortly after. On October 23, 2020, it was announced that filming for new season, which commenced prior to Quibi's closure announcement, would continue as planned. On August 18, 2021, it was announced that a new season of the show would air on The Roku Channel following their previous acquisition of Quibi's shows. On February 9, 2022, it was announced that the episodes would be released on February 25, 2022, under the title Reno 911! Defunded.

External Links
 Official Roku website

References

Reno 911!
Reno 911!